Qelaq Burteh (also Romanized as Qelāq Būrteh; also known as Qalāqbūrtā, Qalāq Qūrtā, and Qolāq Qūrtā) is a village in Atrak Rural District, Dashli Borun District, Gonbad-e Qabus County, Golestan Province, Iran. At the 2006 census, its population was 342, in 70 families.

References 

Populated places in Gonbad-e Kavus County